Eharius is a genus of mites in the Phytoseiidae family.

Species
The genus Eharius contains the following species:
 Eharius chergui (Athias-Henriot, 1960)
 Eharius hermonensis Amitai & Swirski, 1980
 Eharius hymetticus (Papadoulis & Emmanouel, 1991)
 Eharius kostini (Kolodochka, 1979)
 Eharius kuznetzovi (Kolodochka, 1979)
 Eharius marzhaniani (Arutunjan, 1969)

References

Phytoseiidae